Lodwrick ("Lod") Monroe Cook (June 17, 1928 in Castor, Louisiana; - September 28, 2020) was an American businessman and philanthropist.

Background and education
Cook was raised in Grand Cane, Louisiana. He received a bachelor's degree in mathematics from Louisiana State University in 1950 and was also a member of the Sigma Chi Gamma Iota Chapter there. After service in the United States Army, Cook returned to LSU and earned a second degree in petroleum engineering in 1955. He later received a Master of Business Administration (MBA) from Southern Methodist University which he attended in the evenings. Louisiana State University, Pepperdine University, California Lutheran University, and St. Augustine's College have awarded Cook honorary degrees for charitable work and contributions. Cook is the father of five children (all adults) and has ten grandchildren. He lives in Sherman Oaks, California. His wife, Carole Diane Cook, died in 2010.

Memberships
Cook was a member of the LSU Alumni Association's board of directors, an organization he had actively worked with and contributed to financially for many years.  Through direct personal donations as well as his own fundraising efforts, Cook donated the money used by LSU for construction of an alumni center.  The , 128-room building was opened in a ceremony led by former president George H. W. Bush and named the in honor of Cook's work.  In addition to LSU, Cook is a member of the chancellor's court of benefactors for Oxford University in England and he is a Life Regent of Pepperdine University.  He previously served on the board of advisors of the Carter Center of Emory University.

Cook is a trustee of the George Bush Presidential Library Foundation and a director of the Ronald Reagan Presidential Foundation.  His financial contributions and work with the Library Foundation of Los Angeles led to the dedication of the Lodwrick Cook Rotunda, an elegant marble rotunda within the library's downtown Los Angeles location.

In 1992, Cook received the Golden Plate Award and inducted into the American Academy of Achievement.

In November 1994, upon appointment by Queen Elizabeth II, Cook was invested by the Prince of Wales with the Insignia of Honorary Knight Commander of the Most Excellent Order of the British Empire (KBE) for his contribution to Anglo-American relations and support for philanthropic projects around the world.

Cook was inducted into the Junior Achievement U.S. Business Hall of Fame in 2000.

Cook is also a member of Augusta National Golf Club in Augusta, Georgia.

Employment 

Beginning in 1956, Cook was employed with Atlantic Richfield Company (ARCO), the seventh largest oil company in the United States.  Cook was hired as an engineer trainee, but went on to hold several management positions in labor relations, refining, marketing and planning, rising to become a vice president of the company in 1970.  After heading up ARCO's West Coast refining marketing operations, he chaired the eight-company Owners’ Committee building the Trans Alaska Pipeline System.  When the multi-million dollar pump station burned, Cook proposed a solution of injecting a drag reducing agent to speed the flow, a success when implemented and resulting in the savings several hundreds of millions of dollars.

In January 1986, he became ARCO's chairman and CEO, succeeding the legendary Robert O. Anderson. Under Cook's leadership, the new ARCO was hailed as the best-managed U.S. company, with profit margins approached by few and returns on equity equaled by none.  He remained in his position for nine years until, in June, 1995, he retired, becoming Chairman Emeritus.

In September, 1997, Cook became Vice Chairman and Managing Director of Pacific Capital Group, a venture capital, merchant banking group founded by Gary Winnick.  The following year, in April, 1998, Cook was installed by Winnick as Co-Chairman of the Board of Directors of Global Crossing, a position Cook held until he stepped down in 2002 during the company's bankruptcy proceedings. Cook also served as chairman of Global Marine Systems beginning in 1999 and Asia Global Crossing in 2000.

In addition to ARCO and Global Crossing, Cook has served on the board of directors for Lockheed Corporation (until 1995), Castle & Cooke, the Kyle Foundation and Litex, Inc. He is also a member of the advisory committee of Aurora Capital Partners.

Cook remains Vice Chairman of Pacific Capital Group and maintains an office at their Los Angeles, California location.

References

External links
 Hall of Distinction Class of 1985-1986

American energy industry businesspeople
Fellows of Keble College, Oxford
Honorary Knights Commander of the Order of the British Empire
2020 deaths
1928 births
ARCO